Senggigi used to be the main tourist strip of the Indonesian island of Lombok, stretched out along several kilometers of the beachfront just to the north of the capital, Mataram.  The site of a building frenzy in the late 1990s when Lombok was hyped to be the next Bali, the communal violence of 2000 and the 2002 Bali bombing dealt Senggigi a severe blow, with tourist numbers declining precipitously and many construction projects halted. Senggigi has now fallen behind Kuta Lombok in the south of the island and the North Western Gili islands in terms of popularity and development.

Sights 
Pura Batu Bolong is a  Hindu temple with 14 altars on a rock on the beach which is visited by many worshippers.  The name means "Rock with a hole". In the south of Senggigi is the grave of Batu Layar (Makam Batu Layar), a Muslim saint. The salty waterfall at the end of Nambung Beach can be reached on foot or by boat.

Gallery

References

External links 
 
 NY Times article  Next Stop Lombok Island

Populated places in Lombok